McLeary is a surname. Notable people with the surname include:

Alan McLeary (born 1964), English footballer and manager
Don McLeary (born 1948), American football coach and politician
Jamie McLeary (born 1981), Scottish golfer
Kindred McLeary (1901–1949), American artist, architect and educator
Marty McLeary (born 1974), American baseball player
Max McLeary (1948–2014), American baseball umpire
Samuel H. McLeary (1881–1924), American aviator
Mr clean

See also
McCleary (surname)